Wanetta Lake is a lake located on Vancouver Island west of Kennedy Lake and south of the Kennedy River.

References

Clayoquot Sound region
Lakes of Vancouver Island
Clayoquot Land District